Events from the year 2006 in Taiwan, Republic of China. This year is numbered Minguo 95 according to the official Republic of China calendar.

Incumbents
 President – Chen Shui-bian
 Vice President – Annette Lu
 Premier – Frank Hsieh, Su Tseng-chang
 Vice Premier – Wu Rong-i, Tsai Ing-wen

Events

January
 15 January – 2006 Democratic Progressive Party chairmanship election.
 25 January
 Su Tseng-chang became the Premier of the Republic of China.
 Tsai Ing-wen became the Vice Premier of the Republic of China.

February
 22 February – The establishment of National Communications Commission.
 27 February – President Chen Shui-bian announced that National Unification Council ceased to function.

May
 31 May – The opening of Bannan Line of Taipei Metro.

June
 9–21 June – 2006 Enterprise Football League.
 10 June – 17th Golden Melody Awards in Taipei.
 16 June – The opening of Hsuehshan Tunnel.
 23 June – The opening of Poképark.

July
 1 July – The establishment of B'in Music.

August
 5 August – The opening of Chiang Wei-shui Memorial Park in Datong District, Taipei.
 6 August – ROC cut diplomatic relations with Chad.

September
 1 September – Fu Hsing Kang College became part of National Defense University.
 6 September – The renaming of Chiang Kai-shek International Airport to Taiwan Taoyuan International Airport.

October
 14 October – The establishment of Hakka Party.
 24 October
 The launching of Sharp Daily in Taipei.
 The opening of THSR Taichung Station in Wuri Township, Taichung County.
 27–29 October – 2006 Taipei International Invitational Futsal Tournament in Taipei.
 28 October – The establishment of Ling Tung Numismatic Museum in Taichung.

November
 3 November
 The opening of Chiayi HSR station in Taibao City, Chiayi County.
 The opening of Tainan HSR station in Gueiren Township, Tainan County.
 7 November – The opening of Hsinchu HSR station in Zhubei City, Hsinchu County.
 9 November – The opening of Taichung Intercontinental Baseball Stadium in Beitun District, Taichung.
 10 November – The opening of Taoyuan HSR station in Zhongli City, Taoyuan County.

December
 9 December – 2006 Republic of China municipal election.
 26 December - The  7.0 and 6.9 Hengchun earthquakes occurred in Pingtung County. Separated by eight minutes, this doublet earthquake resulted in several deaths and injuries.

Deaths
 3 June – Ni Wen-ya, 103, Taiwanese politician, MLY (1948–1988), PLY (1972–1988).
 10 September – Chang Chuan-tien, 61, Taiwanese politician, MLY (1999–2006), liver failure.
 5 November – Chen Ding-nan, 63, Taiwanese politician,  MLY (1990–2000), Minister of Justice (2000–2005), lung cancer.

References

 
Years of the 21st century in Taiwan